Piz Radönt is a mountain of the Albula Alps, overlooking the Fuorcla da Grialetsch in the canton of Graubünden. It lies south of the Flüela Schwarzhorn, on the range between the Dischma valley and the Flüela Pass.

References

External links

 Piz Radönt on Hikr

Mountains of the Alps
Mountains of Graubünden
Mountains of Switzerland
Davos